Santasri Chatterjee (born 10 May 1940) was a member of the 14th Lok Sabha of India. He represented the Serampore constituency of West Bengal and is a member of the Communist Party of India (Marxist) (CPI(M)) political party. In 2009 he lost to Kalyan Banerjee who is from All India Trinamool Congress(AITC).

References

External links
 Official biographical sketch in Parliament of India website

Living people
1940 births
Communist Party of India (Marxist) politicians from West Bengal
People from Hooghly district
India MPs 2004–2009
Lok Sabha members from West Bengal